Loni Love (born July 14, 1971) is an American comedian, television host, actress, author, and former electrical engineer. While working as an electrical engineer in the early 2000s, she switched to music engineering, until later launching a career in stand-up comedy. She was the runner-up on Star Search 2003 and was named among the "Top 10 Comics to Watch" in both Variety and Comedy Central in 2009. She was one of the co-hosts of the syndicated daytime talk show The Real, which ran from July 15, 2013 and ended on June 3, 2022.

Life and career
Love was born in Detroit, Michigan, and grew up in the Brewster-Douglass Housing Projects. Prior to her career as a comedian, she was an electrical engineer, an experience she talks about in many of her acts. After graduating from Cass Technical High School in 1985, she worked for a time on the General Motors assembly line putting doors on 1993 Oldsmobile Cutlasses, work which ignited her interest in electrical engineering. Love then received her bachelor's degree in electrical engineering from Prairie View A&M University in Texas. While at Prairie View, she minored in music and was also a member of the Eta Beta chapter of Delta Sigma Theta. It was there that she discovered stand-up comedy after winning a $50 competition and then performed frequently during her college life.

After finding work as an engineer at Xerox in California, she continued to do stand-up after work in clubs and became a regular at the Laugh Factory. After eight years of working at Xerox, Love resigned to pursue comedy during a layoff to prevent someone else from losing their job. Love did a series on VH1 called I Love the 2000s in which she gives her view on pop culture highlights. She was also a panelist in the late-night talk show Chelsea Lately.  Love also appeared in an episode of Supermarket Sweep on July 24, 2000. 

Love started her comedic career in 2003, after appearing on Star Search, reaching the finals and losing in a close competition to winner John Roy. Since then, she has appeared in films and numerous television shows. Love was named "Hot Comic" for 2009 in Campus Activity magazine and one of the "Top 10 Comics to Watch" in both Variety and Comedy Central. She was awarded the Jury Prize for best stand-up at the 2003 US Comedy Arts Festival. In 2008 Love became the CNN correspondent for D. L. Hughley Breaks the News and covered the inauguration of President Barack Obama. In late 2009, Love recorded her first one-hour Comedy Central special, America's Sister, which aired on May 8, 2010. In July 2013, she released her first comedy advice book titled "Love Him Or Leave Him But Don't Get Stuck With The Tab". It was published by Simon & Schuster.

From July 15, 2013 to June 3, 2022, Love served as one of the co-hosts of the syndicated daytime talk show The Real originally alongside Adrienne Bailon, Tamar Braxton, Jeannie Mai, and Tamera Mowry. After premiering on July 15, 2013 on Fox Television Stations, The Real was picked up to series the following year. In 2015, she appeared in the comedy film Paul Blart: Mall Cop 2, with Kevin James, and the action film Bad Asses on the Bayou, with Danny Trejo and Danny Glover. She also won the ninth season Worst Cooks in America in 2016, winning $50,000 for her chosen charity. In 2018, Love and her Real co-hosts won the Daytime Emmy Award for Outstanding Entertainment Talk Show Host for their work.

In 2020 during the COVID-19 pandemic, Love hosts a show on Instagram Live under the hashtag #quarantinewithloni. Love's show attracts 50,000 to 100,000 viewers.

Since January 2021, Love has been a recurring guest judge on Season 13 of Rupaul's Drag Race. Love currently hosts, alongside Alec Mapa, Squirrel Friends: The Official Rupaul's Drag Race Podcast since 2022.

Filmography

Awards and nominations

Notes

References

External links

1971 births
21st-century American actresses
21st-century American comedians
Actresses from Detroit
African-American actresses
African-American female comedians
African-American television talk show hosts
American electrical engineers
American stand-up comedians
American television actresses
American television talk show hosts
American women comedians
Living people
Prairie View A&M University alumni
21st-century African-American women
21st-century African-American people
20th-century African-American people
20th-century African-American women